Keemun is a famous Chinese black tea. First produced in the late 19th century, it quickly became popular in the West and is still used for a number of classic blends. It is a light tea with characteristic stone fruit and slightly smoky notes in the aroma and a gentle, malty, non-astringent taste reminiscent of unsweetened cocoa. Keemun is said to have floral aromas and wooden notes.

History
Original Keemun is produced exclusively in the Qimen County in the south of Anhui province. It is grown in  Guichi,  Shitai,  Dongzhi, and  Yixian. The name of the tea is an older Western spelling of the name of the nearby town, Qimen (pronounced "Chee-mun"). The tea-growing region lies between the Yellow Mountains and the Yangtze River. The cultivar used for Keemun is the same as that used in production of Huangshan Maofeng. While the latter is an old, well-known variety of green tea, Keemun was first produced in 1875 using techniques adapted from Fujian province farmers.

Many varieties of Keemun exist, with different production techniques used for each. Nevertheless, any Keemun undergoes particularly slow withering and oxidation processes, yielding more nuanced aroma and flavor. Some of Keemun's characteristic floral notes can be attributed to a higher proportion of geraniol, compared to other black teas.

Varieties
Among the many varieties of Keemun perhaps the most well-known is Keemun Mao Feng. Harvested earlier than others, and containing leafsets of two leaves and a bud, it is lighter and sweeter than other Keemun teas. Another high grade variety, containing mostly leaves and stronger than others, is the Keemun Hao Ya. For Western markets, it is separated by quality into Hao Ya A and Hao Ya B categories, the former being somewhat better than the latter. Either has a markedly intense taste. Other varieties include those specifically tailored for the Gongfu tea ceremony (Keemun Gongfu, or Congou – ) and Keemun Xin Ya, an early bud variety, said to have less bitterness. One of the black teas produced in neighboring Hubei province is sometimes referred to as a Hubei Keemun by several tea companies, but is not a Keemun in the true sense of the term.

References

External links
 Tea Guardian: Qimen Maofeng (Keemun Black Tea)

Black tea
Chinese teas
Chinese tea grown in Anhui
Huangshan City